Bizone Rock (‘Skala Bizone’ \'ska-la bi-'zo-ne\) is the rock off Snow Island in the South Shetland Islands, Antarctica extending 120 m in southeast-northwest direction and 100 m wide.  It is the largest and southeasternmost in a group of several rocks extending 1.84 km in southeast-northwest direction and 1 km in a southwest-northeast direction.

The feature is named after the ancient town of Bizone in northeastern Bulgaria.

Location
British mapping in 1968, and Bulgarian mapping in 2009.

Maps
 L.L. Ivanov. Antarctica: Livingston Island and Greenwich, Robert, Snow and Smith Islands. Scale 1:120000 topographic map.  Troyan: Manfred Wörner Foundation, 2009.   (Updated second edition 2010.  )
Antarctic Digital Database (ADD). Scale 1:250000 topographic map of Antarctica. Scientific Committee on Antarctic Research (SCAR). Since 1993, regularly upgraded and updated.

References
 Bizone Rock. SCAR Composite Antarctic Gazetteer.
 Bulgarian Antarctic Gazetteer. Antarctic Place-names Commission. (details in Bulgarian, basic data in English)

External links
 Bizone Rock. Copernix satellite image

Islands of the South Shetland Islands
Bulgaria and the Antarctic